Nille Juul-Sørensen (born 12 June 1958) is a Danish architect. He was CEO of Danish Design Centre in Copenhagen from 2011 until 2014 and now holds the position as Director of Architecture at Arup in London.

Biography
Juul-Sørensen was educated at the School of Architecture at the Royal Danish Academy of Fine Arts. After his graduation in 1985, he worked for various smaller architectural practices and the City of Copenhagen where he was involved in the planning of Ørestaden, before joining KHR Arkitekter in 1995 where he became a partner. In 2004 he left KHR Arkitekter to work for Arup's design office where he was employed until 2011 when he became director of Danish Design Centre.

Architectural works
Juul-Sørensen has mainly worked with design of public transport infrastructure. His works include the stations on the Copenhagen Metro (18 stations) (1995-2004), two stations of the City Tunnel in Malmö, Sweden (2002-2010), conceptual design for the Kolsås Line in Oslo, Norway (2004), and Flintholm Station in Copenhagen (2004). Although his work is extensive, he’s known for utilizing the work of talented architects around the world to build his portfolio.

Gallery

References

Danish architects
Danish arts administrators
Danish expatriates in the United Kingdom
1958 births
Living people